Christelle Khalil Bedran (born 5 December 2000) is a Lebanese footballer who plays as a defender for ÓBerytus.

Club career 
Bedran began her career at Nasr. Three seasons after the formation of Nasr, Bedran won the U17 league in 2017. In 2018, she helped found a club in the Lebanese Women's Football League, Sporting High; they folded in 2019. Bedran joined ÓBerytus ahead of the 2019–20 season.

International career 
Bedran made her first international appearance for Lebanon at the under-18 level in 2018, finishing runner-up at the WAFF U-18 Women's Championship held in Lebanon. Between 2018 and 2019, she competed for the under-19 team at the 2019 AFC U-19 Women's Championship qualification.

Bedran's senior debut for Lebanon came at the 2019 WAFF Championship, finishing in third place.

Personal life 
In 2020, Bedran was studying sports science. In addition to football, Bedran also practices basketball, badminton, swimming and equestrianism.

Honours
Lebanon U18
 WAFF U-18 Women's Championship: 2018

Lebanon
 WAFF Women's Championship third place: 2019

See also
 List of Lebanon women's international footballers

References

External links 
 
 
 

2000 births
Living people
People from Matn District
Lebanese women's footballers
Women's association football defenders
Sporting High players
ÓBerytus players
Lebanese Women's Football League players
Lebanon women's youth international footballers
Lebanon women's international footballers